Scenarioart (シナリオアート, Shinarioāto) is a three-member pop-rock Japanese band founded in 2009 by guitarist Kōsuke Hayashi and bassist Takahisa Yamashita, with drummer Kumiko Hattori joining in 2011. The band released the single "White Raincoat Man" in April 2013, which reached 2nd place on the Oricon Weekly Indies Chart, whereafter the EP - DRAMATICS - was released in June the same year on the band's independent label ES FICTION MUSIC. The band was signed to the Kioon Music record label in 2014, where they remained until 2018, when they decided to produce independently on their own label es.faction. As of 2020, they have released 3 full length albums, 5 EPs, and 6 singles.

Their songs have been used in multiple anime series, including the ending themes of Boruto: Naruto Next Generations, Subete ga F ni Naru, and The Tatami Galaxy, the first two of which were released as singles, respectively "Sayonara Moon Town" in 2017, and "Nana Hitsuji" in 2015 on the split single  with Kana-Boon.

Members

The current members of the band are:
, guitar, vocals

, drums, vocals

, bass, chorus

Discography

Albums

Extended plays

Singles

References

Japanese musical groups